USS Cockatoo was a  coastal minesweeper, built in 1936 as Vashon by the Seattle Construction and Dry Dock Company, Seattle, Washington, which was acquired by the United States Navy on 23 October 1940 and commissioned as USS Cockatoo (AMc-8), on 25 April 1941.

Cockatoo was placed in service on 25 April 1941 and operated in the 14th Naval District from Pearl Harbor where she was undamaged during the attack on Pearl Harbor throughout World War II. She was transferred to the Maritime Commission for disposal on 23 September 1946.

References

External links
 

Merchant ships of the United States
Ships built in Seattle
1936 ships
Ships present during the attack on Pearl Harbor
Minesweepers of the United States Navy
World War II minesweepers of the United States